Yana Urqu (Quechua yana black, urqu mountain, "black mountain", also spelled Yana Orkho) is a  mountain in the Bolivian Andes. It is located in the Cochabamba Department, Mizque Province, Mizque Municipality. The Yana Urqu Mayu ("black mountain river") originates northwest of the mountain. Its waters flow to the Mizque River.

References 

Mountains of Cochabamba Department